Tyler Jeffrey Dillashaw (born February 7, 1986) is an American retired professional mixed martial artist who competed in the Ultimate Fighting Championship (UFC), where he is a former two-time UFC Bantamweight Champion. 

Dillashaw competed on the 2011 Ultimate Fighter season. In 2014, he won the UFC Bantamweight Championship by dethroning Renan Barão, who was on a 32-fight unbeaten streak. Dillashaw lost the title to Dominick Cruz by split decision in 2016 before regaining it against Cody Garbrandt in 2017. He was later stripped of the belt in 2019 after testing positive for a banned substance, erythropoietin, in the drug tests for his UFC Flyweight Championship bout against Henry Cejudo. He received a two-year suspension and made his comeback in 2021, challenging for the bantamweight championship again in 2022 before retiring.

Early life
Dillashaw was born in Sonora, California, to Hal and Janice Dillashaw. He grew up in Angels Camp, California.

Wrestling

High school
While wrestling for Coach Jan Schulz at Bret Harte High School, Dillashaw was a four-time sectional qualifier and two-time California Interscholastic Federation (CIF) state qualifier. As a junior, Dillashaw placed fifth at the CIF state championships, and ended the season with a record of 45–7. He placed second at the CIF State championships as a senior to cap off a 52–6 record and finished with an overall record of 170–33.

Collegiate
With a successful high school career, Dillashaw received a full-ride scholarship to wrestle for Cal State Fullerton Titans. In the 2005–06 season, Dillashaw's freshman year, he posted a 14–16 record including a 10–8 mark in dual matches. He went 3–4 in Pac-10 dual meets. Dillashaw traveled to Ukraine in the summer of 2006 to work on his wrestling skills. Dillashaw's sophomore season was a more successful one having an overall record of 17–14 with an 11–4 mark in duals, including 5–3 in the Pac-10. In April 2007, he placed sixth in the University Greco Wrestling Championships in Akron, Ohio, at 132.25 pounds.

Mixed martial arts career
After graduating from California State University, Fullerton in 2009 with a Bachelor of Science in kinesiology, Dillashaw contemplated turning to MMA. Mark Muñoz coached at Cal St. Fullerton for 3 years, while competing in the UFC middleweight division and invited Dillashaw to join the Reign Training Center fighter class at the conclusion of his senior year. After training with Team Reign for a year and a half, Munoz encouraged Dillashaw to move up north closer to his hometown of Angels Camp, CA to Team Alpha Male in Sacramento, CA. Dillashaw began training with Team Alpha Male, and collected a 2–0 amateur record before turning pro.

On March 26, 2010, Dillashaw made his professional debut against fellow pro debutant, Czar Sklavos. Dillashaw used his superior wrestling to earn a dominant unanimous decision win. Two months later, Dillashaw returned to fight Brandon Drucker, winning the fight via first round submission. The fight took place at Fight For Wrestling, an MMA event located in California attempting to raise money to fund the Cal Poly wrestling team.

The Ultimate Fighter
In 2011, Dillashaw signed with the Ultimate Fighting Championship to compete on The Ultimate Fighter: Team Bisping vs. Team Miller. In the first episode, he fought Matt Jaggers to gain entry into the Ultimate Fighter house. Dillashaw defeated Jaggers in the first round via TKO.

Dillashaw was selected as a part of Team Bisping, he was the second bantamweight chosen for the team (seventh overall). Dillashaw defeated Roland Delorme via rear naked choke submission in the preliminary round and moved onto the semi-finals. It was there he fought Dustin Pague for the first spot in the bantamweight final on the finale card. Dillashaw dominated Pague, grinding out three tough rounds to win the fight via unanimous decision (30–26, 30–27, 30–26).

Ultimate Fighting Championship
Dillashaw officially made his UFC debut on December 3, 2011, in Las Vegas, Nevada at The Ultimate Fighter 14 Finale. The fight was the final of the bantamweight tournament against John Dodson to determine the winner of The Ultimate Fighter 14. Dillashaw lost via TKO.

Dillishaw's sophomore outing came on February 15, 2012, at UFC on Fuel TV 1 against Walel Watson. Dillashaw dominated Watson using his superior wrestling to control him on the ground, while nearly ending the fight several times with multiple submission attempts. Dillashaw won the bout via unanimous decision (30–25, 30–25, 30–26).

Dillashaw fought Vaughan Lee on July 11, 2012, at UFC on Fuel TV: Munoz vs. Weidman. He won the fight by submission via a standing neck crank in the first round.

Dillashaw was expected to face Mike Easton on December 8, 2012, at UFC on Fox 5.  However, Dillashaw was forced out of the bout with an injury and replaced by Bryan Caraway.

Dillashaw faced Issei Tamura on March 16, 2013, at UFC 158. Dillashaw won via knock-out 26 seconds into the second round.

Dillashaw faced Hugo Viana on April 20, 2013, at UFC on Fox 7, replacing an injured Francisco Rivera. He won the fight via TKO in round one.

Dillashaw was briefly linked to a bout with Raphael Assunção on September 4, 2013, at UFC Fight Night 28. The fight was delayed due to Assunção suffering a minor medical issue.

The bout was rescheduled and took place on October 9, 2013, at UFC Fight Night 29.  Assunção defeated Dillashaw via split decision. The back and forth action earned both the participants Fight of the Night honors.

Dillashaw faced Mike Easton on January 15, 2014, at UFC Fight Night 35. He won the fight via unanimous decision.

First Bantamweight Championship Reign
Dillashaw was expected to face Takeya Mizugaki on May 24, 2014, at UFC 173. However, with the show losing its main event, Dillashaw was moved up the card to face Bantamweight champion and top 5 pound for pound Renan Barão in the featured bout. In one of the biggest upsets in UFC and MMA history, Dillashaw won the fight in dominant fashion, defeating Barão via TKO in the fifth round to become the new UFC Bantamweight champion. In addition to winning the title, Dillashaw received bonuses for Fight of the Night and Performance of the Night.

While interviewing Dillashaw after the fight, Joe Rogan said:

An immediate rematch with Barão was scheduled to take place on August 30, 2014, at UFC 177. However, the day of the weigh-ins, Barão had to be admitted to the hospital as a result of his attempts to cut weight and was replaced by Joe Soto who was already scheduled to compete in a fight on the event's preliminary card.  Dillashaw defeated Soto via knockout in the fifth round.  The win also earned Dillashaw his second consecutive Performance of the Night bonus award.

A rematch with Barão was rescheduled and was expected to take place on April 25, 2015 at UFC 186.  However a month before the event, Dillashaw was forced out of the bout after sustaining a broken rib while training.

The rematch eventually took place at UFC on Fox 16 on July 25, 2015.  Dillashaw won the fight via TKO in the fourth round to retain his title. He also earned a Performance of the Night bonus.

Dillashaw faced former champion Dominick Cruz on January 17, 2016 at UFC Fight Night 81 He lost the bout and the title via split decision. Both participants were awarded Fight of the Night honors.

Road back to the title
A rematch with Raphael Assunção took place on July 9, 2016 at UFC 200. He won the fight via unanimous decision.

Dillashaw faced John Lineker on December 30, 2016 at UFC 207. He won via a dominant unanimous decision, wherein the bout was scored a 30-26 in favour of Dillashaw by all three judges.

Coaching The Ultimate Fighter  and regaining the title
In January 2017, the UFC announced that Dillashaw would be one of the coaches, opposite current UFC Bantamweight champion (and former Team Alpha Male teammate) Cody Garbrandt on The Ultimate Fighter 25, with the pairing expected to face each other on July 8, 2017 at UFC 213. However the bout was scrapped on May 23 after Garbrandt sustained a back injury. The bout was rescheduled and eventually took place on November 4, 2017 at UFC 217. Dilashaw won the fight via knockout in the second round to regain the UFC Bantamweight Championship. This win also earned Dillashaw his fifth Performance of the Night bonus award.

Dillashaw faced Cody Garbrandt in a rematch for the UFC Bantamweight Championship on August 4, 2018, at UFC 227. He defeated Garbrandt in the first round by way of TKO. This win earned him the Performance of the Night award.

Fight with Henry Cejudo
Dillashaw was initially scheduled to face Henry Cejudo on January 26, 2019 at UFC 233 for the UFC Flyweight Championship. However, after that pay-per-view event was cancelled, the fight was moved a week earlier to headline UFC Fight Night 143 on January 19, 2019. Dillashaw lost the fight via TKO just 32 seconds into the first round.

Doping ban and relinquishment of Bantamweight title
On March 20, 2019, Dillashaw announced that he would be voluntarily relinquishing the UFC bantamweight championship after USADA and the New York State Athletic Commission (NYSAC) found adverse findings following his bout against Henry Cejudo. Dillashaw received a 12-month suspension from the NYSAC, retroactive to January 19, 2019, the date of his bout against Cejudo.On April 9, it was announced Dilllashaw had been suspended for two years by USADA (an additional suspension to what was given by the NYSAC) due to testing positive for recombinant human erythropoietin (EPO) prior to the Henry Cejudo bout. He became eligible to return on January 19, 2021. 

On April 12, Dillashaw broke his silence over the drug test failure and UFC suspension with a post on Instagram, acknowledging that he had used a banned substance and stated that the decision was his alone, and that what he "really [felt] bad about" was the bad light he brought upon his coaches, family and teammates by association. He also said his use of EPO was limited to the Cejudo fight and said that USADA had retested all of the samples from his prior drug tests to confirm this.

Return from suspension
After the two-year hiatus due to his USADA suspension, Dillashaw was scheduled to face Cory Sandhagen on May 8, 2021 at UFC on ESPN 24. However, Dillashaw announced on April 27 that he had to pull out of the fight due to a cut he received from a headbutt in training. The pair was rescheduled and served as the main headliner for UFC on ESPN: Sandhagen vs. Dillashaw on July 24, 2021. Dillashaw won the fight via split decision. The decision was seen as somewhat controversial, with many fans, fighters, and media members expressing their belief that Sandhagen won the bout. 17 of 23 media outlets scored the bout as a victory for Sandhagen. During the fight, Dillashaw suffered a knee injury which kept him out of action over the next year.

Dillashaw faced Aljamain Sterling for the UFC Bantamweight Championship on October 22, 2022 at UFC 280, attempting to become UFC champion for a record-tying third time. Dillashaw, who was hampered by a dislocated shoulder from early on in the bout, lost the fight via technical knockout in round two. In his post-fight speech, Dillashaw admitted  that he had come into the fight with an ongoing shoulder problem, saying "I probably dislocated it 20 times in training camp."

On December 5th 2022, Dillashaw was  removed from the UFC roster after deciding to retire from MMA.

Personal life
Dillashaw married Rebecca, in June 2014. In October 2015, Dillashaw left Team Alpha Male and moved his camp to Denver, Colorado, to train with his head coach, former UFC fighter Duane Ludwig.

Championships and achievements
Ultimate Fighting Championship
UFC Bantamweight Championship (Two times)
Two successful title defenses - First reign
One successful title defense - Second reign
Three successful title defenses - Overall
Tied with Dominick Cruz and Aljamain Sterling for the most successful consecutive Bantamweight title defenses in UFC history - (2)
First fighter to finish a title bout in the fifth round twice (UFC 173 & UFC 177)
Second most finishes in UFC Bantamweight division history (8)
Most knockouts in UFC Bantamweight division history (7)
Tied (Aljamain Sterling) for most wins in UFC Bantamweight division history (13)
Most wins in UFC Bantamweight title bouts (five)
Fight of the Night (Three times) vs. Raphael Assunção, Renan Barão, and Dominick Cruz
Performance of the Night (Five times) vs. Renan Barão (2), Joe Soto, and Cody Garbrandt (2)
The Ultimate Fighter 14 Runner-up
World MMA Awards
2014 Upset of the Year vs. Renan Barão at UFC 173
Pundit Areana
2017 Fight of the Year vs. Cody Garbrandt
MMAjunkie.com
2021 July Fight of the Month

Amateur wrestling
California Interscholastic Federation
CIF High School State Championship Runner-up (2004)
CIF All-State (2003, 2004)
National Collegiate Athletic Association
NCAA Division I Qualifier  out of California State University (Fullerton)  (2007, 2008, 2009)
Pac-10 133 lb Conference 4th Place  out of California State University (Fullerton)  (2007, 2008)

Mixed martial arts record

|-
|Loss
|align=center|17–5
|Aljamain Sterling
|TKO (punches)
|UFC 280
|
|align=center|2
|align=center|3:44
|Abu Dhabi, United Arab Emirates
|
|-
|Win
|align=center|17–4
|Cory Sandhagen
|Decision (split)
|UFC on ESPN: Sandhagen vs. Dillashaw
|
|align=center|5
|align=center|5:00
|Las Vegas, Nevada, United States
|
|-
|Loss
|align=center|16–4
|Henry Cejudo
|TKO (punches)
|UFC Fight Night: Cejudo vs. Dillashaw
|
|align=center|1
|align=center|0:32
|Brooklyn, New York, United States
|
|-
|Win
|align=center|16–3
|Cody Garbrandt
|KO (knee and punches)
|UFC 227 
|
|align=center|1
|align=center|4:10
|Los Angeles, California, United States
|
|-
|Win
|align=center|15–3
|Cody Garbrandt
|TKO (punches)  
|UFC 217
|
|align=center|2
|align=center|2:41
|New York City, New York, United States
|
|-
|Win
|align=center|14–3
|John Lineker
|Decision (unanimous)
|UFC 207
|
|align=center|3
|align=center|5:00
|Las Vegas, Nevada, United States
|
|-
|Win
|align=center|13–3
|Raphael Assunção
|Decision (unanimous)
|UFC 200
|
|align=center|3
|align=center|5:00
|Las Vegas, Nevada, United States
|
|-
|Loss
|align=center|12–3
|Dominick Cruz
|Decision (split)
|UFC Fight Night: Dillashaw vs. Cruz
|
|align=center|5
|align=center|5:00
|Boston, Massachusetts, United States
|
|-
|Win
| align=center| 12–2
| Renan Barão
| TKO (punches)
| UFC on Fox: Dillashaw vs. Barão 2
| 
| align=center| 4
| align=center| 0:35
| Chicago, Illinois, United States
| 
|-
|Win
| align=center| 11–2
| Joe Soto
| KO (head kick and punches)
| UFC 177
| 
| align=center| 5
| align=center| 2:20
| Sacramento, California, United States
| 
|-
|Win
| align=center| 10–2
| Renan Barão
| TKO (head kick and punches)
| UFC 173
| 
| align=center| 5
| align=center| 2:26
| Las Vegas, Nevada, United States
| 
|-
|Win
| align=center| 9–2
| Mike Easton
| Decision (unanimous)
| UFC Fight Night: Rockhold vs. Philippou
| 
| align=center| 3
| align=center| 5:00
| Duluth, Georgia, United States
| 
|-
|Loss
| align=center| 8–2
| Raphael Assunção
| Decision (split)
| UFC Fight Night: Maia vs. Shields
| 
| align=center| 3
| align=center| 5:00
| Barueri, Brazil
| 
|-
|Win
| align=center| 8–1
| Hugo Viana
| TKO (punches)
| UFC on Fox: Henderson vs. Melendez
| 
| align=center| 1
| align=center| 4:22
| San Jose, California, United States
| 
|-
|Win
| align=center| 7–1
| Issei Tamura
| KO (head kick and punches)
| UFC 158
| 
| align=center| 2
| align=center| 0:26
| Montreal, Quebec, Canada
| 
|-
|Win
| align=center| 6–1
| Vaughan Lee
| Submission (neck crank)
| UFC on Fuel TV: Muñoz vs. Weidman
| 
| align=center| 1
| align=center| 2:33
| San Jose, California, United States
| 
|-
|Win
| align=center| 5–1
| Walel Watson
| Decision (unanimous)
| UFC on Fuel TV: Sanchez vs. Ellenberger
| 
| align=center| 3
| align=center| 5:00
| Omaha, Nebraska, United States
| 
|-
| Loss
| align=center| 4–1
| John Dodson
| TKO (punches)
| The Ultimate Fighter: Team Bisping vs. Team Miller Finale
| 
| align=center| 1
| align=center| 1:54
| Las Vegas, Nevada, United States
| 
|-
|Win
| align=center| 4–0
| Taylor McCorriston
| TKO (punches) 
| Capitol Fighting Championships
| 
| align=center| 3
| align=center| 1:07
| Sacramento, California, United States
| 
|-
|Win
| align=center| 3–0
| Mike Suarez
| Submission (rear-naked choke)
| Rebel Fighter: Domination
| 
| align=center| 1
| align=center| 2:42
| Roseville, California, United States
| 
|-
|Win
| align=center| 2–0
| Brandon Drucker
| Submission (rear-naked choke)
| Fight For Wrestling 1
| 
| align=center| 1
| align=center| 2:46
| San Luis Obispo, California, United States
| 
|-
|Win
| align=center| 1–0
| Czar Sklavos
| Decision (unanimous)
| KOTC: Legacy
| 
| align=center| 3
| align=center| 5:00
| Reno, Nevada, United States
| 
|-

Pay-per-view bouts 

| Win
| align=center| 3–0
| Dustin Pague
| Decision (unanimous)
| rowspan=3|The Ultimate Fighter: Team Bisping vs. Team Miller
| 
| align=center| 3
| align=center| 5:00
| rowspan=3|Las Vegas, Nevada, United States
| 
|-
| Win
| align=center| 2–0
| Roland Delorme
| Submission (rear-naked choke)
| 
| align=center| 2
| align=center| 1:44
| 
|-
| Win
| align=center| 1–0
| Matt Jaggers
| TKO (punches)
| 
| align=center| 1
| align=center| 4:59
|

NCAA record

! colspan="8"| NCAA Championships Matches
|-
!  Res.
!  Record
!  Opponent
!  Score
!  Date
!  Event
|-
! style=background:white colspan=6 |2009 NCAA Championships at 133 lbs
|-
|Loss
|0-6
|align=left|Rick Deubel
|style="font-size:88%"|MD 3-12
|style="font-size:88%" rowspan=2|March 19, 2009
|style="font-size:88%" rowspan=2|2009 NCAA Division I Wrestling Championships
|-
|Loss
|0-5
|align=left|Nick Fanthorpe
|style="font-size:88%"|TF 4-19
|-
! style=background:white colspan=6 |2008 NCAA Championships at 133 lbs
|-
|Loss
|0-4
|align=left|Dave Marble
|style="font-size:88%"|7-11
|style="font-size:88%" rowspan=2|March 20, 2008
|style="font-size:88%" rowspan=2|2008 NCAA Division I Wrestling Championships
|-
|Loss
|0-3
|align=left|Tyler McCormick
|style="font-size:88%"|2-5
|-
! style=background:white colspan=6 |2007 NCAA Championships at 133 lbs
|-
|Loss
|0-2
|align=left|Dan Mitcheff
|style="font-size:88%"|4-8
|style="font-size:88%" rowspan=2|March 16, 2007
|style="font-size:88%" rowspan=2|2007 NCAA Division I Wrestling Championships
|-
|Loss
|0-1
|align=left|Dave Marble
|style="font-size:88%"|7-14
|-

See also
 List of male mixed martial artists
 List of UFC bonus award recipients

References

External links
 
 

1986 births
Living people
American male mixed martial artists
Bantamweight mixed martial artists
Mixed martial artists utilizing Muay Thai
Mixed martial artists utilizing collegiate wrestling
Mixed martial artists utilizing Brazilian jiu-jitsu
Mixed martial artists from California
American male kickboxers
American male sport wrestlers
American Muay Thai practitioners
American practitioners of Brazilian jiu-jitsu
People from Calaveras County, California
California State University, Fullerton alumni
Ultimate Fighting Championship champions
Cal State Fullerton Titans wrestlers
People from Tuolumne County, California
Doping cases in mixed martial arts
Ultimate Fighting Championship male fighters